is a 2006 Japanese black comedy film directed by Minoru Kawasaki, as a parody of the 2006 film Sinking of Japan.

It is based on the 1973 short story of the same name by Yasutaka Tsutsui (a parody of the novel Japan Sinks, released the same year), which criticizes nationalism and racism. It also describes humans as powerless against disaster.

Plot
In the year 2011 the greatest tectonic disaster in the history of mankind occurs. As a result of catastrophic earthquakes, massive volcanic eruptions, and huge tsunamis, North and South America, Eurasia, Africa, Indonesia and Australia have sunken underwater while the Japanese islands remain untouched, thanks to the Chinese land which has sunk and gone underneath them.

Japan suddenly discovers that it is the destination for all the world's surviving refugees. Consequently, they are all forced to make uncomfortable adjustments in order to share the world's last habitable landmass. However, they finally discover that the Japanese islands will eventually sink as well since the Chinese land supporting them is moving rapidly towards the Pacific Ocean. At this time, the leaders of various countries, including North Korea, surrounded in the darkness with a small candlelight and, finally, received a short-term peace shortly before Japan sank (one of the characters finally told a rhyme about the mitten and the animals who wanted to stay there). In the end, Japan sank and so humanity perished, turning the Earth into an ocean planet.

External links
 

2006 black comedy films
2006 films
Films directed by Minoru Kawasaki
Apocalyptic films
Japanese black comedy films
Films set in 2011
2006 comedy films
2000s Japanese films